Demotic may refer to:

 Demotic Greek, the modern vernacular form of the Greek language
 Demotic (Egyptian), an ancient Egyptian script and version of the language 
 Chữ Nôm, the demotic script for writing Vietnamese

See also

 Demos (disambiguation)
 Domotics
 Territorial nationalism